Hymenaeus may refer to:

 Hymen (god), also known as Hymenaios, a deity in Greek mythology
 Hymenaeus (biblical figure), a heretical teacher in Ephesus
 Grady Louis McMurtry, also known as Hymenaeus Alpha
 William Breeze (Hymenaeus Beta), his successor in the Caliphate Ordo Templi Orientis